Lytton's Diary is a drama TV series made by Thames Television for the ITV network about the life of a newspaper gossip columnist.

Cast

Episodes

Storyboard
Lytton's Diary (30 August 1983) - director Brian Parker

Series One
Rabid Dingo — Shock Horror (9 January 1985) - director Herbert Wise
Daddy's Girls (16 January 1985) - director Peter Sasdy
The Lady in the Mask (23 January 1985) -  director Herbert Wise
Tricks of the Trade (30 January 1985) -  director Peter Sasdy
The Silly Season (6 February 1985) -  director Herbert Wise
Come Uppance (13 February 1985) - director Peter Sasdy

Series Two
The Ends and the Means (8 January 1986) - director Derek Bennett
Rules of Engagement (15 January 1986) - director Michael Ferguson
The Ancien Régime (22 January 1986) - director Derek Bennett
The Miracle Man (29 January 1986) - director Michael Ferguson
National Hero (5 February 1986) -  director Derek Bennett
What a Wonderful World (12 February 1986) - director Michael Ferguson

Theme Tune
The Theme Tune for the series was written by Rick Wakeman which he describes in a YouTube video.

The Theme Tune is available to listen to at this link on YouTube.

References

External links

1983 British television series debuts
1986 British television series endings
1980s British drama television series
ITV television dramas
Television shows produced by Thames Television
English-language television shows